The 2010–11 season was Milton Keynes Dons' seventh season in their existence as a professional association football club, and their third consecutive season competing in Football League One.

As well as competing in League One, the club also participated in the FA Cup, League Cup and League Trophy.

The season covers the period from 1 July 2010 to 30 June 2011.

Competitions

League One

Final table

Source: Sky Sports

Matches

Play-offs

FA Cup

Matches

League Cup

Matches

League Trophy

Matches

Player details
List of squad players, including number of appearances by competition.
Players with squad numbers struck through and marked  left the club during the playing season.

|}

Transfers

Transfers in

Transfers out

Loans in

Loans out

References

External links

Official Supporters Association website
MK Dons news on MKWeb

Milton Keynes Dons
Milton Keynes Dons F.C. seasons